Melik Shahnazar II  was the melik of Varanda, one of the five Melikdoms of Karabakh, in the 18th century. He is a controversial figure in Armenian history, whose actions contributed significantly to the demise of Armenian Melikdoms of Karabakh.

Early years
Shahnazar's date of birth is unknown. He was of mixed Armenian and Turkman origin: his father was Melik Hussein of Varanda, while his mother was the daughter of the Khan of Nakhichevan, whom Melik Hussein had captured and married. He was the half-brother of Melik Hovsep Shahnazarian of Varanda.

Accession to power
Shahnazar killed his half-brother Melik Hovsep Shahnazarian and the latter's son Sahi Beg in 1750 and seized control of Varanda as Melik Shahnazar II. He sided with the chieftain of nomadic Sarijali branch of the Turkic Javanshir clan, Panah Ali, accepting his suzerainty and ceding the fortress of Shushi to him, after which Panah Ali made it the capital of the newfound Karabakh Khanate. He forced the meliks of Jraberd and Gulistan to flee and severely weakened the melik of Dizak. A truce was reached in 1760 when the meliks were allowed to remain in possession of their lands in return for recognition of Panah as Khan of Karabakh. 
Shahnazar further consolidated his alliance with Khans of Karabakh by marrying his daughter Hurizad (Khurizat, Hurzat) Khanum off to Panah Ali's son Ibrahim Khalil Khan. He died in 1792.

Legacy and memory
Armenian liberation movement figure Joseph Emin calls him a traitor and a villain for killing his relatives, usurping the melikdom of Varanda and allying himself with Panah Ali against the rest of the Meliks of Karabakh.
Emin wrote that Shahnazar "adopted in his private life the polygamous customs of the Persians", whereby he "greatly shocked and revolted the religious feelings of the people, and incurred the hatred of all the other Meliks".

According to Bishop Makar Barkhudaryants, although Shahnazar regretted his actions in the last years of his life, the Armenians of Karabakh did not forgive him, slamming him in their folk stories with satire via Pele Pughi's character, which depicted the latter as the melik's disobedient jester who constantly provokes the ruler to do silly things, so that he would remain on the right path out of fear of finding himself in laughable situations.

Shahnazar restored Amaras Monastery in the late 1780s, hoping to achieve forgiveness for his sins by this. His descendants, who continued to live in Shushi, took good care of Amaras Monastery, restoring it for the last time in 1858.

Descendants
Shahnazar's son Melik Jumshud, together with Melik Abov of the House of Melik-Beglarian, helped Ibrahim Khan against Agha Mohammad Khan Qajar when he besieged Shushi in 1795 spring. When Russian forces led by General Pavel Tsitsianov captured Ganja Fortress, Melik Jumshud persuaded Ibrahim Khan to accept Russian dominance without fight in 1805. Melik Jumshud subsequently killed Ibrahim Khan with the help of lieutenant-colonel Dmitri Lisanevich when Ibrahim switched sides and invited the Persians to capture Shushi 1806. Jumshud and Lisanevich caught and killed Ibrahim Khan while he was on his way to join Persian prince Abbas Mirza's camp at Shosh village.

Karen Shakhnazarov, a Soviet and Russian filmmaker, producer and screenwriter, is one of several living descendants of the Melik-Shahnazarian princely family. His father Georgy Shakhnazarov was a Soviet politician and political scientist who was a close aid of Mikhail Gorbachev.

References

External links 
 "The Meliks of Eastern Armenia" by Aspet Emin.  
 "Khamsa Melikdoms" by Raffi (in Armenian)

Armenian nobility

17th-century people of Safavid Iran

18th-century people of Safavid Iran
Year of birth missing
1792 deaths